The Internal Troops of Mongolia are the paramilitary gendarmerie who perform special guard and reserve duties in the Mongolian Armed Forces. It protects buildings for institutions and areas such as the Mongolian National Broadcaster and Altan-Ölgii National Cemetery.

They are led by a chief of staff who reports directly to the minister of justice and internal affairs.

History
It is the successor to the Internal Troops of the Mongolian People's Army (officially known as the Border and Internal Troops Administration). During the Cold War, it was responsible for border patrol, for guard duties, and immigration control. By the end of the 1980s, it numbered around 15,000 troops. The Internal Troops were originally formed in 1922 by the Military 
Council with over ten divisions, serving under the name of Special Unit for Internal Security Affairs.

The Internal Troops in their current form were adopted in 1995, serving for 18 years until its governing law was repealed on 16 March 2013 by the State Great Khural with the backing of the Altankhuyag government. After its repealment, its functions were transferred to the National Police Agency and the border guard by 1 April 2014. After a thorough look into the matter and the victory of the MPP in the 2016 Mongolian legislative election, the recreation of the Internal Troops was reconsidered.

In February 2017, the parliament formally passed a law to recreate the Internal Troops.

Units 

 Damdin Sükhbaatar 5th Military Unit

See also 

 Ministry of Justice and Internal Affairs (Mongolia)

References

Military of Mongolia
Gendarmerie
Law enforcement in Mongolia
Military units and formations established in 1995
Military units and formations disestablished in 2013